Clay Cross (Quarry Services) Ltd v Fletcher [1978] 1 WLR 1429 is a UK labour law case concerning sex discrimination, unequal pay, and the limits of justifications for it. It would now fall under the Equality Act 2010 sections 64 to 80.

Facts
Mrs Fletcher was paid £35 per week, with three other clerks. A colleague left and was replaced by Mr Tunnicliffe, aged 24. He was the only suitable candidate and was paid £43 per week, which matched his previous salary. Pay was increased by £6 a week, but the disparity stayed. An expert said that clerks’ wages should be set at £43.46, but Mr Tunnicliffe’s wage still remained higher, at £49. Mrs Fletcher spent a while training him, and then when the EPA 1970 came into force in 1975, she complained.

Tribunal held that Ms Fletcher did have an equal pay claim. The EAT reversed this, holding that the man’s previous salary was a genuine material factor. Mrs Fletcher successfully appealed.

Judgment
Lord Denning MR held that the factor relied on in section 1(3)(a) had to be ‘personal’ to the worker concerned.

Lawton LJ and Browne LJ concurred.

See also

UK labour law
UK employment equality law
Macarthys Ltd v Smith in which the court referred the matter to the ECJ; and decided then similarly.

References

United Kingdom labour case law
Court of Appeal (England and Wales) cases
1978 in case law
1978 in British law